Raino Koskenkorva (6 December 1926 – 24 December 2013) was a Finnish cyclist. He competed in the individual and team road race events at the 1952 Summer Olympics.

References

External links
 

1926 births
2013 deaths
Finnish male cyclists
Olympic cyclists of Finland
Cyclists at the 1952 Summer Olympics
People from Kotka
Sportspeople from Kymenlaakso